Douglas Robert Brown (born 29 October 1969) is a Scottish former cricketer and former head coach of the United Arab Emirates national team. Brown represented the Scottish national team as an all-rounder at One Day International (ODI) and Twenty20 International level, having earlier played  One Day International cricket for England in 1997 and 1998. He played English county cricket for Warwickshire.

Playing career

As a youngster Brown attended Alloa Academy, represented Clackmannan County Cricket Club and played football at under-18 level for Scotland, and played for Feltham Rugby Football club as a competent fullback, choosing to focus on cricket shortly afterwards.

He first came to the attention of Warwickshire County Cricket Club in 1992 whilst playing for Scotland, he signed for the county and made his debut in the same year. He went on to spend his entire career with the county, for whom he has scored over 12500 runs and taken over 850 wickets at first-class and list A cricket. At this point he also played for the north Birmingham club Aston Unity CC.

Highlights of Brown's Warwickshire career included his contributions to their successes of the mid-1990s.  In 1995 he helped Warwickshire to win the NatWest Trophy,
and also scored 506 runs, and took 37 wickets at 27.32, as the county won the County Championship. In 1997 he scored 374 runs and took 17 wickets as Warwickshire won the AXA Life League, and in the same year took his career best first-class bowling figures, 8 for 89 when playing for a First Class Counties XI against Pakistan 'A'.

In 1997 Brown was named in England's one-day squad for four nations Champions Trophy at Sharjah. He made his debut on 11 December in England's narrow 7-run victory over their hosts, in this game Brown took no wickets and scored 6 runs. However, it was England's next game, on 13 December against the West Indies, that Brown gave his greatest performance as an England player.

He dismissed Philo Wallace with the opening ball of the game before going on to dismiss his Warwickshire teammate Brian Lara, then at the height of his powers, leg before wicket two balls later. This opening allowed England to take an easy victory. This game aside, Brown failed to excel at one-day cricket, and the 1998 tour of the West Indies was to prove his last.

He played for Scotland in the 2005 ICC Trophy, taking 11 wickets in the tournament, and scoring 59 runs in the final, to help Scotland win the competition. As a result, Scotland gained temporary One-day International status, and Brown has since played ODI cricket for Scotland in the 2006 European Cricket Championships, 2007 World Cricket League and 2007 Cricket World Cup.

In a twenty20 fixture between Warwickshire and Northamptonshire Steelbacks in July 2007, Brown suffered a severe Achilles tendon injury which ultimately ended his career.

Coaching career

During the 2003 Cricket World Cup, Brown coached the Namibian team. He also coached them in South African domestic one-day cricket in the 2002/03 season, playing one game as an overseas player. Outside of cricket Brown works as a PE teacher.

At the end of the 2007 season, Brown retired from cricket to take up a coaching role at Warwickshire County Cricket Club. He was sacked despite having had success with the team by winning won two trophies, the T20 Blast in 2014 and 2016 Royal London One-Day Cup.

In January 2017, Brown was appointed head coach of the United Arab Emirates national team, succeeding interim coach Owais Shah. Brown moved on from UAE Cricket in 2020 and is now actively involved with the PSL (Pakistan Super League) and RedBear Consulting in the UAE.

See also
 List of cricketers who have played for more than one international team

References

External links
 

1969 births
Living people
Directors of Cricket
Scottish cricketers
England One Day International cricketers
Warwickshire cricketers
Wellington cricketers
Dual international cricketers
Scotland One Day International cricketers
Scotland Twenty20 International cricketers
Cricketers at the 2007 Cricket World Cup
Scottish cricket coaches
Scottish cricket commentators
BBC sports presenters and reporters
People educated at Alloa Academy
Scottish footballers
Scotland youth international footballers
Marylebone Cricket Club cricketers
Namibia cricketers
Coaches of the Namibia national cricket team
British expatriates in Namibia
Association footballers not categorized by position
Scottish expatriate sportspeople in the United Arab Emirates
Coaches of the United Arab Emirates national cricket team
First-Class Counties Select XI cricketers
Sportspeople from Clackmannanshire